Glen(n) Duncan may refer to:

Glen Duncan (born 1965), British author
Glenn E. Duncan (1918–1998),  United States Air Force officer
Glenn Duncan (ice hockey), selection in 1979 NHL Entry Draft
Glenn Duncan, member of band Country Gentlemen     [Glen Duncan is not on this page]
W. Glenn Duncan, winner of the Shamus Award

See also

Duncan Glen (1933–2008), Scottish poet and literary editor